Copeland is a constituency in Cumbria created in 1983 and represented in the House of Commons of the UK Parliament. The constituency is represented in Parliament by Trudy Harrison, of the Conservative Party, since a by-election in February 2017. It was retained at the snap 2017 general election four months later. The seat had been held by Labour candidates at elections between 1983 and 2015 included.

Copeland is one of five Cumbria seats won (held or gained) by a Conservative candidate in 2019 out of a total of six covering the county. The bulk of this seat is in the Lake District, together with a large proportion of its population.

History
The sole forerunner to the constituency was the abolished constituency of Whitehaven. Copeland consistently returned Labour Party candidates since its creation in 1983 until the by-election of 23 February 2017, when Trudy Harrison gained it for the Conservatives. Prior to that (save for the landslide in 1931 when part of the parliamentary Labour Party remained in government with the Conservative Party under Ramsay MacDonald), the last Conservative elected for the area was in 1924.

The 2015 result gave the seat the 31st most marginal majority of Labour's 232 seats by percentage of majority.

Boundaries

Following the renaming of Whitehaven as Copeland, Jack Cunningham, who had previously been the member for Whitehaven, stood for and won the seat. Its boundaries remained unchanged, being coterminous with the local government district of Copeland.

Boundary change
Parliament accepted the Boundary Commission's Fifth Periodic Review of Westminster constituencies by making changes to this constituency for the 2010 general election, namely the addition of the wards Crummock, Dalton, Derwent Valley and Keswick in the Allerdale District.

The four new wards thus extend the constituency beyond the district of Copeland. They include the town of Keswick, which has a larger electorate than the other three new and sparsely populated wards, despite their extensive area. The new wards are in the Lake District, like much of Copeland district. The inclusion of Keswick in the constituency was the main topic in public consultations regarding the changes.

Members of Parliament

Elections

Elections in the 2010s

Elections in the 2000s

Elections in the 1990s

Elections in the 1980s

See also

List of parliamentary constituencies in Cumbria

Notes

References

Politics of Cumbria
Parliamentary constituencies in North West England
Constituencies of the Parliament of the United Kingdom established in 1983
Borough of Copeland